Thomas Danielson (born March 13, 1978) is an American retired professional road racing cyclist who competed professionally between 2002 and 2015 for the Mercury Cycling Team (2002), the Saturn Cycling Team (2003),  (2004),  (2005–2007) and  (2008–2015). He had been suspended twice for doping in his career.

Career

Early years
Danielson holds the record for the fastest ascent of Mount Washington, New Hampshire, in the Mount Washington Auto Road Bicycle Hillclimb. The previous record holder was professional cyclist Tyler Hamilton. He also holds the record for the Mount Evans Hill Climb in Colorado, which traverses the highest paved road in North America. The previous record holder was Jonathan Vaughters, who was Danielson's manager on his last professional team.

In 2004, Danielson had an uneventful stint on the Italian UCI ProTeam , missing the early spring campaign because of visa problems. Subsequently, he raced for the American UCI ProTour team , with which he won the 2005 Tour de Georgia and the 2006 Tour of Austria. After Discovery Channel disbanded at the end of 2007, Danielson became part of the  team.

2010

Danielson started the season by finishing twelfth at both the Tour Méditerranéen and the Tour du Haut Var. Following his two twelfth-place finishes, Danielson, however, struggled through Paris–Nice, finishing only fifty-second overall. Following, Paris–Nice, Danielson regained his form at the Tour of the Gila, placing second to Levi Leipheimer. A couple of weeks later, Danielson rode the Tour of California, but was unable to complete the race. After California, Danielson returned to form at the Tour de Suisse, finishing twenty-fifth overall. Following Suisse, Danielson finished in eighth place at both the Tour de Pologne and the Trofeo Melinda. A month later, Danielson rode his fifth Vuelta a España. He completed the race as the highest placed American, in eighth place. Danielson concluded the season with a thirty-ninth place at the Giro dell'Emilia.

2011

Danielson started the season with the Vuelta a Mallorca, and finished thirty-sixth in the third classic, the Trofeo Deia. Danielson, however, was unable to complete the fourth and fifth classics, the Trofeo Magaluf-Palmanova and the Trofeo Inca. Following the Spanish races, Danielson finished thirty-first overall at the Volta ao Algarve, and a preseason best of twentieth overall at the Vuelta a Murcia. However, after Murcia, Danielson's form deteriorated, finishing fifty-fifth overall at the Volta a Catalunya, forty-seventh at the GP Miguel Induráin, and eightieth overall at the Tour of the Basque Country. Danielson withdrew from racing after these races, and focused on rebuilding his form. A few weeks later, Danielson returned to racing, and finished twentieth overall at the Tour de Romandie. Danielson finished third overall at the Tour of California, and ninth overall at the Tour de Suisse, which ultimately led him to a Tour de France debut. At the Tour, Danielson rode well, and finished as the highest placed American, in eighth place. After the Tour, Danielson finished fifth overall at the Tour of Utah, and fourth overall at the inaugural USA Pro Cycling Challenge. Following the two American stage races, Danielson concluded the season with an eighty-sixth place at the Grand Prix Cycliste de Montréal.

2012
After being unable to complete the Tour de Langkawi, Danielson returned to form during the Volta a Catalunya, where he finished twelfth overall, and second in the mountains classification. Following Catalunya, Danielson finished twentieth at the Tour of the Basque Country, and offered a good showing at the Tour of California, where he took fifth place in the "queen stage" of the race, a finish at altitude at the winter ski station of Mount Baldy. He also came in ninth place in stage five's individual time trial, therefore keeping a high placing in the overall classification. These performances helped him climb to third overall. After California, Danielson finished eleventh at the United States National Road Race Championships, seventh at the Tour de Suisse, and was selected to start his second Tour de France. However, due to injuries sustained from crashes, Danielson abandoned the Tour during stage six. The following month, Danielson returned to competition at the Tour of Utah, where he finished eleventh overall, and assisted with stage two's team time trial win. After Utah, Danielson competed in the USA Pro Cycling Challenge, where he finished seventh overall, and by soloing up and over Independence Pass, won stage three. Bicycling subsequently named the stage, "the most exciting day of road racing on American soil".

2013
Following his six-month ban, Danielson returned to racing at the Volta a Catalunya, where he finished tenth overall. After Catalunya, Danielson, however, was unable to complete the GP Miguel Induráin, but returned to form during the Tour of the Basque Country, where he finished eleventh overall. Danielson continued to ride strong, and finished fourth overall at the Tour de Romandie. Danielson started the Giro d'Italia hoping to assist teammate Ryder Hesjedal in a repeat victory, however, Hesjedal withdrew following stage twelve. After Hesjedal's departure, Danielson was able to ride for himself, but fell ill during the latter weeks, and finished only 49th overall. In June, Danielson was selected to start his third Tour de France as a domestique; he finished the Tour in 60th place. Following the Tour, Danielson competed in, and won the Tour of Utah. Danielson concluded the season by finishing third overall at the USA Pro Cycling Challenge.

2014
In August, Danielson returned to racing at the Tour of Utah and won the general classification for the second consecutive year. He also finished second at the USA Pro Cycling Challenge in August. The following month, Danielson confirmed his participation in the Icon LASIK Tour of the Moon.

2015
For 2015 cycling events, Danielson was sponsored by Cannondale, Full Speed Ahead (FSA), Icon Lasik, Mavic, Smith Optics, Prestige Imports, Vega Sport and Biotta.

On January 20, 2015, actor Patrick Dempsey and Tom Danielson hosted a cycling event in Arizona called "Ride On, Tucson!" featuring a  downtown circuit that was completely closed to traffic for three hours.

In March, Danielson won the mountains classification at the Volta a Catalunya. In May, Danielson abandoned the Giro d'Italia because of a knee injury.

Doping
In a September 2012 online-forum post,  team manager and owner Jonathan Vaughters stated that Danielson had used blood doping products to increase oxygen delivery to his muscles. Later that day, the organization issued a statement confirming his acceptance to a six-month ban from September 1, 2012, to March 1, 2013. The action included the stripping of all race results between March 1, 2005, and September 23, 2006. Danielson released his own statement a day later that expressed regret at his decision to "cross the line." "I accept responsibility for my choices and apologize to everyone in my life for them – in and out of the sport", he said.

In August 2015, Danielson revealed he tested positive for synthetic testosterone. In October 2016, he accepted a four-year suspension for "unintentionally consuming" dehydroepiandrosterone.

Personal
Born in East Lyme, Connecticut, Danielson currently resides in Longmont, Colorado. After spending his childhood years in Connecticut, Danielson attended Fort Lewis College in Durango, Colorado.

Sponsorships

In 2013, Danielson signed a sponsoring agreement with Icon Lasik, a Colorado-based provider of cataract, LASIK, as well as the organizer of Tour of the Moon. The contract was signed after he had won 2013 Tour of Utah.

In August 2014, he signed a sponsorship contract with Cannondale Bicycle Corporation for 2015, together with 13 other riders, as a part of the new relationship between Cannondale Bicycle Corporation, the American bicycle manufacturer, and Slipstream Sports, the sports management group behind the  UCI ProTeam.

He also has sponsorship agreements with Mavic, Smith Optics, Prestige Imports, Vega Sport and Biotta.

Major results
Sources:

2001
 1st  Collegiate Mountain Bike Championships
2002
 1st  Collegiate Mountain Bike Championships
 1st  Overall Tour of Qinghai Lake
1st Stages 5 & 8
 1st Mount Washington Auto Road Bicycle Hillclimb
2003
 1st  Overall Tour de Langkawi
 1st  Overall Cascade Cycling Classic
 1st  Overall International Tour de Toona
 1st Mount Washington Auto Road Bicycle Hillclimb
 2nd Time trial, National Road Championships
 2nd Sea Otter Classic
 3rd Overall Redlands Bicycle Classic
 5th Overall Tour de Georgia
 5th Overall Nature Valley Grand Prix
1st Stage 2
2004
 1st Mount Evans Hill Climb

2005
 1st  Overall Tour de Georgia
1st Stage 5
 4th Overall Setmana Catalana de Ciclisme
 5th Overall Tour de Langkawi
 7th Overall Tour of Austria
 7th Overall Vuelta a España
2006
 1st  Overall Tour of Austria
 2nd Overall Tour de Georgia
1st Stage 5
 6th Overall Vuelta a España
1st Stage 17
 8th Overall Tour of California
 9th Overall Tour de l'Ain
 10th Overall Tirreno–Adriatico

2007
 1st Mount Evans Hill Climb
2008
 1st Stage 4 (TTT) Tour de Georgia
 5th Time trial, National Road Championships
 5th Overall Tour of Missouri
2009
 1st Mount Evans Hill Climb
 3rd Overall Vuelta a Burgos
1st Stage 4 (ITT)
 9th Overall Tour of California
2010
 2nd Overall Tour of the Gila
 8th Overall Vuelta a España
 8th Trofeo Melinda
 9th Overall Tour de Pologne
2011
 3rd Overall Tour of California
 4th Overall USA Pro Cycling Challenge
 5th Overall Tour of Utah
 8th Overall Tour de France
1st Stage 2 (TTT)
 9th Overall Tour de Suisse
2012
 1st Stage 2 (TTT) Tour of Utah
 3rd Overall Tour of California
 7th Overall Tour de Suisse
 7th Overall USA Pro Cycling Challenge
1st Stage 3
2013
 1st  Overall Tour of Utah
 3rd Overall USA Pro Cycling Challenge
 4th Overall Tour de Romandie
 10th Overall Volta a Catalunya
2014
 1st  Overall Tour of Utah
1st Stage 4
 2nd Overall USA Pro Cycling Challenge
2015
 1st  Mountains classification Volta a Catalunya

Grand Tour general classification results timeline

See also
List of doping cases in cycling

Notes

References

External links

 VELOBIOS Rider Profile
 CyclingNews.com 2005 interview
 SI article
 
 

1978 births
Living people
People from East Lyme, Connecticut
American male cyclists
American sportspeople in doping cases
American Vuelta a España stage winners
Doping cases in cycling
Cyclists from Connecticut